Bernardo Vargas (born March 31, 1939) is an Argentine former footballer.

Career 
Vargas played with Talleres Cordoba in 1958. In 1960, he played in the Argentine Primera División with Racing, and later with Argentinos Juniors. In 1964, he played in the Mexican Primera División with Club América. In 1965, he played in the Eastern Canada Professional Soccer League with Toronto Italia, where he secured an ECPSL Championship in 1966. He played with Toronto Falcons originally in the National Professional Soccer League in 1967, and later in the North American Soccer League. 

In 1968, he played in the American Soccer League with Rochester Lancers. The following season he returned to Canada to play in the National Soccer League with Toronto Hungaria. He re-signed with Toronto for the 1970 season.

References 

1939 births
Argentine footballers
Talleres de Córdoba footballers
Racing Club de Avellaneda footballers
Argentinos Juniors footballers
Club América footballers
Toronto Italia players
Toronto Falcons (1967–68) players
Rochester Lancers (1967–1980) players
Argentine Primera División players
Liga MX players
Eastern Canada Professional Soccer League players
National Professional Soccer League (1967) players
North American Soccer League (1968–1984) players
American Soccer League (1933–1983) players
Sportspeople from Mendoza, Argentina
Living people
Association football defenders
Canadian National Soccer League players
Argentine expatriate sportspeople in Canada
Expatriate soccer players in Canada